The 2013 Malaysia National Basketball League Regular Season was the 33rd season of competition of the Malaysia National Basketball League (MNBL) since its establishment. A total of five teams competed in the league. The regular season began on 6 September 2013 with the 1st Series in Miri, Sarawak and ended on 29 September 2013 in Kuala Lumpur.

Pre-season

A new format was announced for the regular season, where the teams will play in three Circuits. The playoff format was also changed: both the semifinals and the finals will be one-off series, instead of best-of-three series.

Teams

Standings & Results

Regular Seasons

1st Circuits (Miri Indoor Stadium, Miri, Sarawak)

Standings

Fixtures and results

2nd Circuits (Bintulu Indoor Basketball Court, Bintulu, Sarawak)

Standings

Fixtures and results

3rd Circuits (Chung Hwa Indoor Stadium, Kota Bharu, Kelantan)

Standings

Fixtures and results

Final standings

Playoffs for 2013 MNBL Overall Champions Cup

The 2013 MNBL Overall Champions Cup started on May 23, 2013 and concluded with Kelantan Warriors defeating Perak Farmcochem in the 2013 MNBL Overall Champions Cup Finals to claim the team's first ever MNBL title.

Semi-finals

 Kelantan Warriors qualified 163-155 on points aggregates.

 Perak Farmcochem qualified 158-143 on points aggregates.

Finals

References

External links
 MABA Official Site 
 AsiaBasket website

Malaysia National Basketball League seasons
MNBL Regular Season
Malaysia